Kyung-ho, also spelled Kyong-ho in North Korea, is a Korean masculine given name. The meaning differs based on the hanja used to write each syllable of the name. There are 54 hanja with the reading "kyung" and 49 hanja with the reading "ho" on the South Korean government's official list of hanja which may be used in given names.

People with this name include:

Entertainers
 Kim Kyung-ho (born 1971), South Korean rock singer
 Jung Kyung-ho (actor, born 1972), South Korean actor
 Ricky Kim (Kim Kyung-ho, born 1981), American actor
 Jung Kyung-ho (actor, born 1983), South Korean actor
 Smeb (born Song Kyung-ho, 1995), South Korean professional League of Legends player

Sportspeople
 Park Kyung-ho (judoka) (born 1963), South Korean judo practitioner
 Chung Kyung-ho (basketball) (born 1970), South Korean basketball player
 Chung Kyung-ho (born 1980), South Korean football striker
 Kwon Kyung-ho (born 1986), South Korean football midfielder
 Jung Kyung-ho (footballer, born 1987), South Korean football midfielder
 Kang Kyung-ho (born 1987), South Korean mixed martial artist
 Min Kyeong-ho (born 1996), South Korean cyclist
 Kim Kyung-ho (archer), South Korean archer who won the 1997 World Archery Championships

Other
 Yi Hwang (1501–1570), courtesy name Gyeongho, Joseon Dynasty Confucian scholar
 An Kyong-ho (born 1930), North Korean politician
 Kim Kyong-ho, North Korean politician chosen to represent Chaedong in the 2014 North Korean parliamentary election

See also
 List of Korean given names

References